This is a chronological list of the deputy prime ministers of Northern Cyprus. A new number is allocated to each new Deputy Prime Minister.

List of deputy prime ministers of Northern Cyprus (1975–present)

Deputy prime ministers of the Turkish Federated State of Cyprus (1975–1983)
This list gives all deputy prime ministers after the founding of the Turkish Federated State of Cyprus, which was intended as an autonomous part of Cyprus, but was rejected by the government of the Republic of Cyprus.

Deputy prime ministers of the Turkish Republic of Northern Cyprus (1983–present)
This list gives all deputy prime ministers after Northern Cyprus' unilateral declaration of independence in 1983, which followed after the refusal of the government of the Republic of Cyprus to recognize the Turkish Federated State of Cyprus.

See also
Deputy Prime Minister of Northern Cyprus

Deputy Prime Ministers